The 2019 Liga 3 Bali was the fifth edition of Liga 3 Bali as a qualifying round for the Lesser Sunda Islands (Bali Nusra) regional round of 2019 Liga 3. The competition began on 24 September 2019 and ended with a final on 7 October 2019.

Putra Tresna Bali were the defending champions, but they were eliminated by Perseden in the semi-finals on 5 October 2019 in a rematch of the previous year's final.

Perseden won their first Liga 3 Bali title with a 4–2 victory on penalties over Tunas Muda Ubud following a 1–1 draw after extra time on 7 October 2019. Perseden would represent Bali Region for the Lesser Sunda Islands regional round.

Format
In this competition, the teams were divided into two groups of five. The two best teams were through to knockout stage. The winner represent Bali Region in Lesser Sunda Islands regional round of 2019 Liga 3.

Teams
There were 10 teams participated in the league this season.

 Bali
 Perseden
 PS Badung
 PSAD Kodam IX/Udayana
 Putra Pegok
 Putra Tresna Bali
 Sportivo Buleleng
 Sulut Bali
 Tunas Muda Ubud
 Undiksha

Group stage
This stage started on 24 September and finished 3 October 2019. All matches was held at Ngurah Rai Stadium and Kompyang Sujana Stadium, Denpasar.

Group A

|}

Group B

|}

Knockout stage

Bracket

Semi-finals

|}

Third place

|}

Final

|}

References 

2019 in Indonesian football
Sport in Bali